Croydon Municipal F.C. was a short-lived English football club based in Croydon, Greater London. They played at the Croydon Arena.

History
The club was established in 2009 from the reserve team of Croydon, although they remained a feeder club. They were immediately elected into Division One of the Combined Counties League. The club finished fourteenth in their first season, and reached the final of the Division One Cup, but left the league at the end of the season.

References

Defunct football clubs in London
Defunct football clubs in England
Association football clubs established in 2009
Association football clubs disestablished in 2010
Combined Counties Football League
Sport in the London Borough of Croydon
2009 establishments in England
2010 disestablishments in England